Staphylinochrous heringi is a species of moth of the Anomoeotidae family.
It is found in Equatorial Guinea.

References

External links 
 
 

Anomoeotidae
Moths of Africa
Moths described in 1954